

Buildings and structures

Buildings
 Early 1220s – Chlemoutsi Crusader castle in Greece is built.
 1220
 Bishop Evrard de Fouilly initiates work on Amiens Cathedral, in Amiens, France, with Robert de Luzarches serving as architect until 1228.
 Brussels Cathedral begun.
 Salisbury Cathedral begun in England.
 Cluny Abbey's 3rd building campaign, initiated in 1080, is over. It is the world's largest religious building until the 16th century.
 Upper three storeys of Qutb Minar in the Delhi Sultanate added.
 c.1220
 Beauvais Cathedral begun.
 Château de Coucy begun.
 Gawdawpalin Temple finished in Bagan, Pagan Kingdom.
 Cressing Temple Barley Barn in eastern England erected.
 1221 – Burgos Cathedral begun.
 1222 – Great Hall of Winchester Castle begun.
 1227
 Marienstatt Abbey church consecrated.
 Toledo Cathedral begun.
 Reconstruction of Toompea Castle begun.
 1228
 July 17 – The foundation stone of the Basilica of San Francesco d'Assisi (completed 1253) in Assisi, Italy is laid.
 1229
 Beverston Castle is completed in England.
 St. Mary's Cathedral, Tallinn begun.

References

Architecture